Benton Township is the name of some places in the U.S. state of Michigan:

 Benton Charter Township, Michigan, in Berrien County
 Benton Township, Cheboygan County, Michigan
 Benton Township, Eaton County, Michigan

See also 
 Benton Township (disambiguation)

Michigan township disambiguation pages